Wakefulness is a daily recurring brain state and state of consciousness in which an individual is conscious and engages in coherent cognitive and behavioral responses to the external world.

Being awake is the opposite of being asleep, in which most external inputs to the brain are excluded from neural processing.

Effects upon the brain
The longer the brain has been awake, the greater the synchronous firing rates of cerebral cortex neurons. After sustained periods of sleep, both the speed and synchronicity of the neurons firing are shown to decrease.

Another effect of wakefulness is the reduction of glycogen held in the astrocytes, which supply energy to the neurons. Studies have shown that one of sleep's underlying functions is to replenish this glycogen energy source.

Maintenance by the brain

Wakefulness is produced by a complex interaction between multiple neurotransmitter systems arising in the brainstem and ascending through the midbrain, hypothalamus, thalamus and basal forebrain.<ref></</ref> The posterior hypothalamus plays a key role in the maintenance of the cortical activation that underlies wakefulness. Several systems originating in this part of the brain control the shift from wakefulness into sleep and sleep into wakefulness. Histamine neurons in the tuberomammillary nucleus and nearby adjacent posterior hypothalamus project to the entire brain and are the most wake-selective system so far identified in the brain. Another key system is that provided by the orexins (also known as hypocretins) projecting neurons. These exist in areas adjacent to histamine neurons and like them project widely to most brain areas and associate with arousal. Orexin deficiency has been identified as responsible for narcolepsy.

Research suggests that orexin and histamine neurons play distinct, but complementary roles in controlling wakefulness with orexin being more involved with wakeful behavior and histamine with cognition and activation of cortical EEG.

It has been suggested the fetus is not awake, with wakefulness occurring in the newborn due to the stress of being born and the associated activation of the locus coeruleus.

See also
 Dream argument
 Eugeroic
 High-conductance state
 Lucid dream
 Sleepwalking

References

External links

Cognition
Mental states